LaPorte CPAs and Business Advisors is an accounting and business advisory firm based in New Orleans, USA.  From 1973 until 2010, the company was known as LaPorte Sehrt Romig & Hand in the Gulf Coast region marketplace and is commonly referred to as LaPorte. The firm sells audit, tax, accounting, and consulting services.  It belongs to the RSM US Alliance of companies.

Milestones 

2004 Merged with Smith, Huval & Associates, L.L.C., in Covington, Louisiana
2007 Merged with The Gautreau Group, L.L.C., in Baton Rouge, Louisiana, and established a Baton Rouge office.
2010 Merged with Hidalgo, Banfill, Zlotnik & Kermali, P.C., in Houston, Texas, and established a Houston office
2011 Changed firm name from LaPorte Sehrt Romig & Hand to LaPorte CPAs & Business Advisors
2015 Merged with Beyer, Stagni & Company in Houma, Louisiana

National Industry Recognition 

INSIDE Public Accounting named LaPorte one of the “Top 200 Accounting Firms” for 2010, 2011, 2012, 2013, 2014, 2015, and 2016.
Accountants Media Group, publishers of Accounting Today, included LaPorte among 35 national “Beyond the Top 100: Firms to Watch” and rated LaPorte ninth of 17 on the journal’s “2013 Regional Leaders” among Gulf Coast firms.
Accountants Media Group, publishers of Accounting Today, named LaPorte one of the “Best Accounting Firms to Work for” in the United States for four consecutive years (2008, 2009, 2010, and 2011).

Local Recognition 

New Orleans CityBusiness included LaPorte on its list of “Best Places to Work” for seven consecutive years (2007 to 2015).

Named to New Orleans Times-Picayune 2016 Top Workplaces-midsize Employers List

Legal Structure 

LaPorte is structured as A Professional Accounting Corporation (APAC).

References

External links 
LaPorte
Who we are
Holly Sharp authors Measuring Damages Involving Individuals
Ted Mason speaks about the McGladrey Alliance Forum
McGladrey names 2011 partner development graduates
Stephen Romig named a Role Model of the Year by Young Leadership Council
LaPorte’s Michele Avery authors article on business valuation 

1946 establishments in Louisiana
Accounting firms of the United States
Companies based in New Orleans
Business services companies established in 1946